Kangan may refer to:
 Kangan, Bushehr
 Kangan, Hormozgan
 Kangan-e Nasri, Hormozgan Province
 Kangan Rural District, in Hormozgan Province
 Kangan, South Khorasan